Zdena Studenková (born May 19, 1954) is a Slovak film and stage actress, and a musical theater singer. She is the holder of the most number of OTO Awards, having won eight times in total.

In addition to performing arts, Studenková is an occasional host and author of literature with four published works, such as two cookbooks and a book featuring her interviews. In 2011, she released a picture book, Moji miláčikovia, for children.

Selected filmography
1975: Kean (TV)
1978: Women's Gossip (TV)
1978: Panna a netvor
1979: Ruy Blas (TV)
1979: Life Is a Dream (TV)
1979: Eugene Onegin (TV)
1979: Cousin Bette (TV, series)
1981: The Misanthrope (TV)
1981: Rembrandt van Rijn (TV, series)
1981: Mojmir II (TV)
1982: I Enjoy the World With You
1982: Clavigo (TV)
1983: Angel in a Devil's Body
1986: Don Carlos (TV, series)
1987: The Miser (theater)
1988: Miss Julie (theater)
1990: Sleeping Beauty
1993: Everything I Like
1998: Lady Chatterley's Lover (TV)
2003: It Will Stay Between Us

Bibliography

Cookbooks
2004: Recepty so štipkou hereckého korenia, IKAR
2005: Nové recepty so štipkou hereckého korenia, IKAR

Other releases
2006: Som herečka: Rozhovory s Jánom Štrasserom with Ján Štrasser, FORZA Music
2011: Moji miláčikovia (picture book including CD Fragile deťom), IKAR. Illustrated by Dušan Pupala

Discography
1995: Dotyky noci, ENA Records

Awards

Controversies 
In 2009, after being asked in  an interview with Czech magazine Reflex why she refers to Romani people as "gypsies", which is considered to be a racial slur, Studenková opined that "90 percent of gypsies are social trash" and explained that she doesn't see a reason to be considerate of people that "basically refuse to be educated and to work, and ignore basic hygiene habits". She added that her views on the Roma community are rooted in her childhood, detailing an experience from elementary school when she had to sit next to a Roma girl with lice. Her comments were met with a wave of criticism in both Czechia and Slovakia for being racist and anti-roma, and were publicly condemned by personalities like Ernest Sarközi, artistic director of the Gypsy Devils orchestra, or Roman Kaiser, president of the European Roma Employment Agency, who called her statements "highly inappropriate".

Studenková doubled down on her negative comments regarding the Roma in 2012, after the Krásna Hôrka Castle was destroyed in a fire caused by two young Roma boys who attempted to lit a cigarette and accidentally set dry grass around the castle on fire. In an interview with Život magazine, Studenková asserted that "the Roma question" would be solved if the same laws applied to both white and Romani people, before continuing: "How come they burned down Krásna Hôrka and you see none of them there ? Why didn't march there the whole village of those who have nothing to do and don't work eight hours a day, and then: You want social benefits ? Did you work for it ? Here you go ! They burned down a historic landmark of incalculable value, brats ! Fuckers are destroying our property, how come they're invincible ?" She also criticized the Christian Democratic Movement (KDH) party's pro-life politics in the same interview, saying "why don't each of them have ten gypsy children adopted ?".

In 2011, Studenková criticized the success of Turkish soap opera Binbir Gece in Slovakia, stating "I don't know if anybody realizes this, but this is another way we let the muslim world into our homes. In Arab states, they would never broadcast our soap operas". Her comments were branded islamophobic and racist by media.

References

Sources

External links 

 Zdena Studenková at SND
 Zdena Studenková at ČSFd
 Zdena Studenková at IMDb
 Zdena Studenková at KinoBox
 Zdena Studenková at SFd
 Zdena Studenková at TCMd

1954 births
Living people
Actors from Bratislava
Slovak stage actresses
Slovak film actresses
Slovak television actresses
Recipients of Medal of Merit (Czech Republic)
Women cookbook writers
Women food writers